Alemony Eneeki is a 1977 studio album by Mohamed Mounir.

Track listing
All lyrics by Abdulrahim Mounsour.  Music by Ahmed Mouib, except where noted.
"Alemony Eneeki" – 02:11 (Hani Shenouda)
"Dunia Rayha" – 06:01
"Ya Sabia" – 04:15
"Amana Ya Bahr" – 03:42 (Shenouda)
"Qool Lel Ghareeb" –
"Fi Eniky Ghorba" – 04:20
"Ya Azab Nafsy" – 03:25 (Shenouda)
"Eh Ya Blad Ya Ghareeba" – 03:32 (Shenouda)
"Yamaah" – 05:55
"El Rezq Ala Allah" – 04:01

External links 
 

1977 albums
Mohamed Mounir albums